I'm Back U Know is the first of 3 mixtapes by Tinchy Stryder, It was released on 2 March 2006 on the label Boy Better Know. The mixtape sees Stryder rapping with big-name rappers  such as Wiley, Kano and Flow Dan from the grime collective Roll Deep. Featuring 17 original productions with Stryder on the mic from start to finish with tracks including big grime hits such as "I'm Pro", "96 Bars" and "1 of them Days".

Track listing

References

External links
 Grime in 2006 - Put The Work In, Then Put The Work Out. Vice (magazine).

2006 mixtape albums
Tinchy Stryder albums